Shanique Ava-Marie Palmer (born 11 November 1987) is a Jamaican communications consultant. She is currently the managing director of Jamaica-based public relations and communications firm Bespoke Communications.

Life and education 
Palmer was born to Stratton Palmer, a notable Jamaican sports analyst, enthusiast and media personality, who is also popularly known as a former Kingston College High football coach; and Claudette Palmer, née Pitters.

Palmer attended St. Andrew-based Immaculate Conception High School in Jamaica, graduating from its sixth form in 2005. She holds a bachelor's degree in Media and Communications and a minor in Spanish from the University of the West Indies (B.A. 2009).

Career 
Palmer began her career in journalism at the Jamaica Observer as part of its TeenAge magazine. After graduating from university, she worked as a journalist at South Florida Times in Fort Lauderdale, Florida, US. She later returned to Jamaica to work at The Gleaner as a sub-editor for its Star and Gleaner publications.

She eventually transitioned from her editorial career to public relations and worked at Blueprint Consulting, Housing Agency of Jamaica and Mayberry Investments in marketing and public relations roles.

She then established Bespoke Communications, operating in Jamaica. Established in March 2016, the agency specialises in public relations and communications services for corporate and private clients. Its team of five along with several external partners develop PR campaigns, inclusive of editorial works, creative design, social media and video production.

To date, its clients have included the National Health Fund, Shipping Association of Jamaica, Development Bank of Jamaica, CGR Communications, Curvy Caribbean Conference, Nostic Agricultural and Manufacturing, Knott Francis Eventures, and recording artiste Samantha Gooden.

Published works 
Palmer was the author of a beauty feature series for The Jamaica Observers All Woman magazine titled 'In Her Skin', in which she profiled prominent women in Jamaican society.

Press 
Palmer was featured in the Jamaica Gleaner's Outlook magazine among eight other women in 2015 as part of its ‘The Beauty in Her Confidence’ feature. In 2016, she was featured with daughter Kate in the Jamaica Gleaner's Flair Magazine as part of its Carnival in Jamaica edition in a feature article titled 'Post-Baby Carnival Body'.

Charities 
Palmer is an active Roman Catholic and has been a catechism teacher for Catholic confirmation classes at Stella Maris Roman Catholic Church for five years.

References

Sources
 'Post-Baby Carnival Body' (14 March 2016). The Jamaica Gleaner. Flair Magazine.
 'The Beauty in Her Confidence' (July 19, 2015). The Jamaica Gleaner. Outlook magazine.
 'In Her Skin - Yendi Phillipps' (30 November 2015). The Jamaica Observer. All Woman magazine.
 'Around South Florida With Elgin Jones 6-27-08' (27 June 2008). South Florida Times.
 'Jamaican Government Corruption Can Drive Citizens Away' (21 May 2010). South Florida Times.
 'Stratton Palmer' KLAS ESPN Sports.

1987 births
Jamaican businesspeople
Communications consultants
University of the West Indies alumni
Living people
People from Kingston, Jamaica
Jamaican women in business